Šime Fantela (born 19 January 1986) is a Croatian professional sailor. Competing in the 470 class with Igor Marenić, he won gold at the 2016 Summer Olympics, the 2009 World Championships, and three European Championships (2009, 2011, 2012).

At the 470 World Championships in 2009 in Rungsted, Fantela and Marenić became the first Croatians to win a gold medal at the ISAF World Championships.

Career

Early career
Fantela began sailing at the age of six. He competed in Optimist World Championships class winning bronze in 1998 and gold in 2000. 

After the early successes in Optimist, he switched to the 470 class with his colleague Igor Marenić. In six junior years in 470, they have won plenty of medals. They have become World Junior Champions on three occasions (2003, 2005 and 2007). They also won silver medal in 2006 and a bronze medal in 2004. At the European Junior Championships, they have won three medals; gold in 2005 and two silver medals (in 2002 and 2006). They won gold medal at the 2005 Summer Universiade in Izmir, Turkey. At their first Mediterranean Games they finished 4th.

Their first bigger success among the seniors came in 2006 when they finished fifth at the World Championships. One year later, at the 2007 World Championships they finished sixth and earned an Olympic quota place for 2008 Summer Olympics becoming the fourth Croatian crew to qualify for the Olympics in 470 class.

2008 Summer Olympics

Fantela and Marenić were selected to represent Croatia at the 2008 Summer Olympics. At the regatta held in Qingdao International Marina between 11 and 18 August, they have finished ninth overall among 29 crews with 107 net points. They have won tenth race and finished in top 10 on four other occasions. In the medal race, they claimed eight place. Overall, Fantela was pleased with their performance at the 2008 Olympics: "We were hoping for top 10 position and we reached it". At the time, ninth place have been the best Croatian result in 470 at the Olympics.

Senior Breakthrough (2009–2012)
After the post-Olympic break, Fantela and Marenić began their campaign towards 2012 Summer Olympics. They won gold medal at the 2009 European Championships in Traunsee, Austria. They have become the first European Champions in Olympic classes from Croatia since 1978. At the 2009 Mediterranean Games in Pescara they won silver medal. Successes from 2009 were crowned at the 470 World Championships in Rungsted when Fantela and Marenić became first Croatian World Champions in Olympic sailing.

In 2010, Fantela and Marenić went on to defend their World title. At the World Championships in The Hague they have won bronze medal though. They finished sixth at the European Championships in Istanbul.

At the 2011 European Championships in Helsinki, Fantela and Marenić regained European title in tight competition with British and Israeli crews. 2011 ISAF Sailing World Championships were held at the end of the year in Perth. Fantela and Marenić defended bronze medal from 2010 470 World Championships and secured an Olympic quota place for the 2012 Summer Olympics.  At the 2012 Summer Olympics Fantela and Marenić finished in 6th place.

Orders
Order of Danica Hrvatska with face of Franjo Bučar - 2016

References

External links
 
 
 

1986 births
Living people
Croatian male sailors (sport)
Olympic sailors of Croatia
Optimist class world champions
Sailors at the 2008 Summer Olympics – 470
Sailors at the 2012 Summer Olympics – 470
Sailors at the 2016 Summer Olympics – 470
Sportspeople from Zadar
Olympic gold medalists for Croatia
Olympic medalists in sailing
Medalists at the 2016 Summer Olympics
Mediterranean Games gold medalists for Croatia
Mediterranean Games silver medalists for Croatia
Competitors at the 2009 Mediterranean Games
Competitors at the 2013 Mediterranean Games
Universiade medalists in sailing
World champions in sailing for Croatia
470 class world champions
Mediterranean Games medalists in sailing
Universiade gold medalists for Croatia
Medalists at the 2005 Summer Universiade
Sailors at the 2020 Summer Olympics – 49er
Optimist class sailors